Nemanja Pavlović  (born September 18, 1977) is a Serbian footballer.

He had played with Serbian clubs FK Teleoptik, top league FK Budućnost Banatski Dvor, that in 2006 became FK Banat Zrenjanin, and Bosnian Premier League club FK Modriča. Since 2008 he has been playing with FK Sloga Kraljevo in the Serbian First League, but in summer 2010 he has moved to another same league club, the more ambitious FK BASK.

External links
 Profile and stats at Srbijafudbal
 Profile at Playerhistory

1977 births
Living people
Footballers from Sarajevo
Serbs of Bosnia and Herzegovina
Association football defenders
Serbian footballers
FK Teleoptik players
FK Budućnost Banatski Dvor players
FK Banat Zrenjanin players
FK Modriča players
FK Sloga Kraljevo players
FK BASK players
Serbian SuperLiga players